"Por Que?" is a 1991 single by German synthpop band Cetu Javu. It featured on the LP and CD versions of their second album Where Is Where.

Track listings

7" vinyl
 Blanco y Negro Music / BNS-277

12" vinyl
 US: ZYX Records / ZYX 6646-12
 SPA: Blanco y Negro Music / MX 277 (1992)

1993 12" vinyl
SPA: Modermusic EP-1004-M

References

1991 singles
Cetu Javu songs